Mamadou Diouf is the Leitner Family Professor of African Studies, the Director of Institute for African Studies, and a professor of Western African history at  Columbia University.

He also serves as director of the Institute of African Studies at the School of International and Public Affairs, Columbia University (SIPA) and has been instrumental in its recent reorganization. Diouf holds a Ph.D. in history from the University of Paris-Sorbonne. Prior to teaching at Columbia, he taught at  the University of Michigan and before that at Cheikh Anta Diop University in Dakar, Senegal. Diouf also serves on the editorial board of several academic journals, including the Journal of African History, Psychopathologie Africaine, and Public Culture. His research interests include the urban, political, social, and intellectual history of colonial and postcolonial Africa. His most recent books are La Construction de l’Etat au Sénégal, written with M. C. Diop & D. Cruise O’Brien and published in 2002 and Histoire du Sénégal: Le modèle islamo-wolof et ses périphéries, published in 2001. He is currently editing Rhythms of the Atlantic World with Ifeoma Nwanko and New Perspectives on Islam in Senegal:  Conversion, Migration, Wealth, Power and Femininity with Mara Leichtman.

Publications
 Tolerance, Democracy, and Sufis in Senegal, ed. 2013 
 with Mara A. Leichtman: New Perspectives on Islam in Senegal. Conversion, Migration, Wealth, and Power, 2009
 with M. C. Diop & D. Cruise O’Brien: La Construction de l’Etat au Sénégal, 2002
 Histoire du Sénégal: Le Modèle Islamo-Wolof et ses Périphéries, 2001 
 with Ulbe Bosma:Histoires et Identités dans la Caraïbe. Trajectoires Plurielles, 2004 
 with R. Collignon: Les Jeunes, Hantise de l’espace public dans les sociétés du sud?, 2001  
 with M. C. Diop: Les figures du politique : Des pouvoirs hérités aux pouvoirs élus, 1999  
 L'Historiographie indienne en débat. Sur le nationalisme, le colonialisme et les sociétés postcoloniales, ed. 1999  
 with Mahmood Mamdani: Academic Freedom and Social Responsibility of the Intellectuals in Africa, 1994
 with M.C. Diop: Le Sénégal sous Abdou Diouf, 1990 
 La Kajoor au XIXe siècle : Pouvoir Ceddo et Conquête Coloniale, 1990

References

External links
 
  
 

Year of birth missing (living people)
Senegalese emigrants to the United States
Serer historians
University of Michigan faculty
Columbia University faculty
Historians of Africa
Living people
Academic staff of Cheikh Anta Diop University
Paris-Sorbonne University alumni
Pantheon-Sorbonne University alumni
Social Science Research Council